G. poeppigii may refer to:

 Gaultheria poeppigii, a heath shrub
 Geogenanthus poeppigii, a dayflower native to the Amazon rainforest